The 2000 Philadelphia Phillies season was the 118th season in the history of the franchise.

Offseason
 November 8, 1999: Jalal Leach was signed as a free agent with the Philadelphia Phillies.
 November 18, 1999: Mark Brownson was selected off waivers by the Philadelphia Phillies from the Colorado Rockies.
 December 12, 1999: Bobby Estalella was traded by the Philadelphia Phillies to the San Francisco Giants for Chris Brock.

Regular season

Season standings

Record vs. opponents

Notable transactions
June 5, 2000: Chase Utley was drafted by the Philadelphia Phillies in the 1st round (15th pick) of the 2000 amateur draft. Player signed July 29, 2000.
June 28, 2000: Jalal Leach was released by the Philadelphia Phillies.
July 26, 2000: Rob Ducey was traded by the Philadelphia Phillies to the Toronto Blue Jays for a player to be named later.
July 26, 2000: Curt Schilling was traded by the Philadelphia Phillies to the Arizona Diamondbacks for Omar Daal, Nelson Figueroa, Travis Lee, and Vicente Padilla.
July 29, 2000: Kent Bottenfield was traded by the Anaheim Angels to the Philadelphia Phillies for Ron Gant.
August 3, 2000: Rico Brogna was selected off waivers by the Boston Red Sox from the Philadelphia Phillies.

Major league debuts
Batters: 
Clemente Álvarez (September 19)  
Pat Burrell (May 24)  
Jimmy Rollins (September 17)  
Reggie Taylor (September 17)  
Pitchers: 
Dave Coggin (June 23)  
Tom Jacquez (September 9)  
Doug Nickle (September 18)

2000 Game Log

|- style="background:#fbb"
| 1 || April 4 || @ Diamondbacks || 4–6 || Randy Johnson (1–0) || Andy Ashby (0–1) || Darren Holmes (1) || 44,298 || 0–1
|- style="background:#fbb"
| 2 || April 5 || @ Diamondbacks || 3–11 || Todd Stottlemyre (1–0) || Paul Byrd (0–1) || Mike Morgan (1) || 29,291 || 0–2
|- style="background:#fbb"
| 3 || April 6 || @ Diamondbacks || 2–3 (11) || Russ Springer (1–0) || Steve Schrenk (0–1) || None || 28,774 || 0–3
|- style="background:#bfb"
| 4 || April 7 || @ Astros || 4–1 || Randy Wolf (1–0) || Octavio Dotel (0–1) || Wayne Gomes (1) || 41,583 || 1–3
|- style="background:#fbb"
| 5 || April 8 || @ Astros || 5–8 || Mike Maddux (1–0) || Chris Brock (0–1) || Billy Wagner (2) || 39,018 || 1–4
|- style="background:#bfb"
| 6 || April 9 || @ Astros || 3–2 || Steve Schrenk (1–1) || Jay Powell (0–1) || Wayne Gomes (2) || 38,784 || 2–4
|- style="background:#bfb"
| 7 || April 10 || Mets || 9–7 || Amaury Telemaco (1–0) || Rich Rodriguez (0–1) || Wayne Gomes (3) || 47,115 || 3–4
|- style="background:#bfb"
| 8 || April 12 || Mets || 8–5 || Robert Person (1–0) || Mike Hampton (0–3) || Wayne Gomes (4) || 15,269 || 4–4
|- style="background:#fbb"
| 9 || April 13 || Mets || 1–2 || Dennis Cook (2–0) || Scott Aldred (0–1) || Armando Benítez (3) || 14,552 || 4–5
|- style="background:#fbb"
| 10 || April 14 || Expos || 0–4 || Dustin Hermanson (1–1) || Chris Brock (0–2) || None || 12,366 || 4–6
|- style="background:#bbb"
| – || April 15 || Expos || colspan=6 | Postponed (rain); Makeup: April 17
|- style="background:#bfb"
| 11 || April 16 || Expos || 5–4 || Scott Aldred (1–1) || Anthony Telford (2–1) || None || 18,648 || 5–6
|- style="background:#bbb"
| – || April 17 || Expos || colspan=6 | Postponed (rain); Makeup: September 11 as a traditional double-header
|- style="background:#fbb"
| 12 || April 18 || @ Braves || 3–4 (12) || Luis Rivera (1–0) || Carlos Reyes (0–1) || None || 34,903 || 5–7
|- style="background:#fbb"
| 13 || April 19 || @ Braves || 1–10 || Tom Glavine (3–0) || Randy Wolf (1–1) || None || 29,992 || 5–8
|- style="background:#fbb"
| 14 || April 20 || @ Braves || 4–6 || Kevin Millwood (1–0) || Scott Aldred (1–2) || John Rocker (1) || 31,451 || 5–9
|- style="background:#bfb"
| 15 || April 21 || @ Marlins || 4–3 || Andy Ashby (1–1) || Vladimir Núñez (0–2) || None || 15,478 || 6–9
|- style="background:#fbb"
| 16 || April 22 || @ Marlins || 2–4 || Jesús Sánchez (3–0) || Paul Byrd (0–2) || Antonio Alfonseca (6) || 22,787 || 6–10
|- style="background:#fbb"
| 17 || April 23 || @ Marlins || 2–5 || Brad Penny (3–1) || Robert Person (1–1) || Antonio Alfonseca (7) || 11,442 || 6–11
|- style="background:#fbb"
| 18 || April 24 || @ Marlins || 1–3 || Alex Fernandez (3–2) || Randy Wolf (1–2) || Antonio Alfonseca (8) || 9,344 || 6–12
|- style="background:#fbb"
| 19 || April 25 || Diamondbacks || 2–10 || Randy Johnson (5–0) || Chris Brock (0–3) || None || 11,926 || 6–13
|- style="background:#fbb"
| 20 || April 26 || Diamondbacks || 4–10 || Todd Stottlemyre (4–1) || Andy Ashby (1–2) || None || 12,250 || 6–14
|- style="background:#bfb"
| 21 || April 27 || Diamondbacks || 5–4 || Wayne Gomes (1–0) || Byung-hyun Kim (0–1) || None || 13,560 || 7–14
|- style="background:#fbb"
| 22 || April 28 || Cardinals || 4–7 || Garrett Stephenson (3–0) || Carlos Reyes (0–2) || Dave Veres (5) || 25,877 || 7–15
|- style="background:#fbb"
| 23 || April 29 || Cardinals || 6–7 (10) || Mike Mohler (1–1) || Wayne Gomes (1–1) || None || 23,031 || 7–16
|- style="background:#fbb"
| 24 || April 30 || Cardinals || 3–4 || Darryl Kile (5–1) || Curt Schilling (0–1) || Mike James (1) || 34,033 || 7–17
|-

|- style="background:#fbb"
| 25 || May 2 || Reds || 0–7 || Denny Neagle (3–0) || Andy Ashby (1–3) || Scott Sullivan (2) || 23,234 || 7–18
|- style="background:#bfb"
| 26 || May 3 || Reds || 5–2 || Paul Byrd (1–2) || Steve Parris (1–4) || None || 23,260 || 8–18
|- style="background:#bfb"
| 27 || May 4 || Reds || 14–1 || Robert Person (2–1) || Pete Harnisch (0–4) || None || 27,564 || 9–18
|- style="background:#fbb"
| 28 || May 5 || @ Braves || 5–6 || Rudy Seánez (1–0) || Wayne Gomes (1–2) || None || 40,174 || 9–19
|- style="background:#bfb"
| 29 || May 6 || @ Braves || 6–0 || Curt Schilling (1–1) || Kevin Millwood (3–1) || None || 48,610 || 10–19
|- style="background:#bfb"
| 30 || May 7 || @ Braves || 7–4 || Andy Ashby (2–3) || Terry Mulholland (3–3) || Wayne Gomes (5) || 40,613 || 11–19
|- style="background:#fbb"
| 31 || May 9 || @ Expos || 2–3 || Steve Kline (1–0) || Wayne Gomes (1–3) || None || 8,845 || 11–20
|- style="background:#bfb"
| 32 || May 10 || @ Expos || 8–0 || Robert Person (3–1) || Javier Vázquez (3–1) || None || 9,411 || 12–20
|- style="background:#bfb"
| 33 || May 11 || @ Expos || 6–4 || Randy Wolf (2–2) || Carl Pavano (3–1) || Wayne Gomes (6) || 8,311 || 13–20
|- style="background:#fbb"
| 34 || May 12 || Braves || 7–8 || Kerry Ligtenberg (1–1) || Wayne Gomes (1–4) || John Rocker (8) || 21,922 || 13–21
|- style="background:#fbb"
| 35 || May 13 || Braves || 2–3 (10) || Rudy Seánez (2–1) || Scott Aldred (1–3) || John Rocker (9) || 20,516 || 13–22
|- style="background:#fbb"
| 36 || May 14 || Braves || 2–11 || John Burkett (2–2) || Paul Byrd (1–3) || None || 22,258 || 13–23
|- style="background:#fbb"
| 37 || May 16 || Cardinals || 2–8 || Andy Benes (3–2) || Robert Person (3–2) || None || 18,399 || 13–24
|- style="background:#bfb"
| 38 || May 17 || Cardinals || 5–4 || Randy Wolf (3–2) || Heathcliff Slocumb (1–3) || Jeff Brantley (1) || 18,941 || 14–24
|- style="background:#fbb"
| 39 || May 18 || Cardinals || 2–7 || Garrett Stephenson (6–0) || Curt Schilling (1–2) || None || 17,137 || 14–25
|- style="background:#fbb"
| 40 || May 19 || Rockies || 2–10 || Pedro Astacio (5–2) || Andy Ashby (2–4) || None || 14,202 || 14–26
|- style="background:#fbb"
| 41 || May 20 || Rockies || 3–4 || Julián Tavárez (3–2) || Chris Brock (0–4) || José Jiménez (6) || 19,192 || 14–27
|- style="background:#bfb"
| 42 || May 21 || Rockies || 4–3 || Robert Person (4–2) || Masato Yoshii (1–5) || Jeff Brantley (2) || 20,612 || 15–27
|- style="background:#fbb"
| 43 || May 23 || @ Astros || 2–10 || Chris Holt (2–6) || Randy Wolf (3–3) || None || 33,381 || 15–28
|- style="background:#bfb"
| 44 || May 24 || @ Astros || 9–7 || Wayne Gomes (2–4) || Billy Wagner (1–3) || Jeff Brantley (3) || 32,665 || 16–28
|- style="background:#fbb"
| 45 || May 25 || @ Astros || 6–10 || Scott Elarton (3–1) || Andy Ashby (2–5) || Joe Slusarski (1) || 34,736 || 16–29
|- style="background:#fbb"
| 46 || May 26 || @ Dodgers || 4–11 || Kevin Brown (4–1) || Paul Byrd (1–4) || None || 37,048 || 16–30
|- style="background:#bfb"
| 47 || May 27 || @ Dodgers || 7–6 || Robert Person (5–2) || Darren Dreifort (3–2) || Jeff Brantley (4) || 33,967 || 17–30
|- style="background:#bfb"
| 48 || May 28 || @ Dodgers || 4–2 || Randy Wolf (4–3) || Antonio Osuna (0–1) || None || 28,603 || 18–30
|- style="background:#fbb"
| 49 || May 29 || @ Giants || 2–7 || Shawn Estes (4–2) || Curt Schilling (1–3) || Alan Embree (1) || 40,930 || 18–31
|- style="background:#fbb"
| 50 || May 30 || @ Giants || 3–7 || Liván Hernández (4–5) || Andy Ashby (2–6) || Robb Nen (8) || 40,930 || 18–32
|- style="background:#fbb"
| 51 || May 31 || @ Giants || 4–10 || Mark Gardner (4–2) || Paul Byrd (1–5) || None || 40,930 || 18–33
|-

|- style="background:#bfb"
| 52 || June 2 || Red Sox || 2–1 (11) || Jeff Brantley (1–0) || John Wasdin (0–2) || None || 22,194 || 19–33
|- style="background:#bfb"
| 53 || June 3 || Red Sox || 9–3 || Randy Wolf (5–3) || Tim Wakefield (1–4) || None || 31,131 || 20–33
|- style="background:#bfb"
| 54 || June 4 || Red Sox || 6–5 (12) || Steve Schrenk (2–1) || Rhéal Cormier (2–1) || None || 27,382 || 21–33
|- style="background:#fbb"
| 55 || June 5 || Devil Rays || 3–5 (12) || Mark Guthrie (3–3) || Jason Boyd (0–1) || Rick White (1) || 13,237 || 21–34
|- style="background:#fbb"
| 56 || June 6 || Devil Rays || 3–5 (10) || Roberto Hernández (2–2) || Jeff Brantley (1–1) || Rick White (2) || 13,415 || 21–35
|- style="background:#bfb"
| 57 || June 7 || Devil Rays || 5–4 || Chris Brock (1–4) || Mark Guthrie (3–4) || Jeff Brantley (5) || 20,514 || 22–35
|- style="background:#bfb"
| 58 || June 9 || @ Orioles || 9–5 || Randy Wolf (6–3) || Pat Rapp (4–4) || None || 47,218 || 23–35
|- style="background:#fbb"
| 59 || June 10 || @ Orioles || 4–11 || Sidney Ponson (4–3) || Curt Schilling (1–4) || None || 48,443 || 23–36
|- style="background:#fbb"
| 60 || June 11 || @ Orioles || 2–7 || Mike Mussina (4–6) || Andy Ashby (2–7) || None || 47,540 || 23–37
|- style="background:#fbb"
| 61 || June 12 || Marlins || 2–5 || Vic Darensbourg (3–0) || Cliff Politte (0–1) || Antonio Alfonseca (19) || 11,926 || 23–38
|- style="background:#bfb"
| 62 || June 13 || Marlins || 4–3 || Wayne Gomes (3–4) || Joe Strong (0–1) || Jeff Brantley (6) || 13,316 || 24–38
|- style="background:#fbb"
| 63 || June 14 || Marlins || 1–8 || Ryan Dempster (7–4) || Randy Wolf (6–4) || None || 14,472 || 24–39
|- style="background:#bfb"
| 64 || June 16 || @ Braves || 2–1 || Curt Schilling (2–4) || Tom Glavine (7–3) || Jeff Brantley (7) || 20,495 || 25–39
|- style="background:#bfb"
| 65 || June 17 || @ Braves || 9–3 || Cliff Politte (1–1) || Terry Mulholland (6–6) || None || 37,292 || 26–39
|- style="background:#fbb"
| 66 || June 18 || @ Braves || 3–5 || John Burkett (5–3) || Steve Schrenk (2–2) || John Rocker (11) || 25,359 || 26–40
|- style="background:#bfb"
| 67 || June 19 || @ Braves || 5–2 || Chris Brock (2–4) || Mike Remlinger (2–2) || Jeff Brantley (8) || 22,264 || 27–40
|- style="background:#bfb"
| 68 || June 20 || @ Mets || 3–2 (10) || Chris Brock (3–4) || Armando Benítez (1–3) || Jeff Brantley (9) || 40,386 || 28–40
|- style="background:#bfb"
| 69 || June 21 || @ Mets || 10–5 || Wayne Gomes (4–4) || John Franco (2–3) || None || 22,524 || 29–40
|- style="background:#fbb"
| 70 || June 22 || @ Mets || 4–5 || Glendon Rusch (5–5) || Cliff Politte (1–2) || Dennis Cook (1) || 21,005 || 29–41
|- style="background:#bfb"
| 71 || June 23 || @ Expos || 13–6 || David Coggin (1–0) || Javier Vázquez (6–4) || None || 8,197 || 30–41
|- style="background:#bfb"
| 72 || June 24 || @ Expos || 8–1 || Randy Wolf (7–4) || Carl Pavano (8–4) || None || 8,374 || 31–41
|- style="background:#fbb"
| 73 || June 25 || @ Expos || 1–3 || Mike Johnson (3–2) || Paul Byrd (1–6) || Steve Kline (8) || 13,164 || 31–42
|- style="background:#bfb"
| 74 || June 27 || Brewers || 7–0 || Curt Schilling (3–4) || Jimmy Haynes (7–7) || None || 15,256 || 32–42
|- style="background:#bfb"
| 75 || June 28 || Brewers || 9–7 || Chris Brock (4–4) || Juan Acevedo (0–3) || Jeff Brantley (10) || 13,520 || 33–42
|- style="background:#fbb"
| 76 || June 29 || Brewers || 6–8 || Jason Bere (5–6) || Steve Schrenk (2–3) || Curtis Leskanic (1) || 21,597 || 33–43
|- style="background:#fbb"
| 77 || June 30 || Pirates || 3–8 || Kris Benson (7–6) || Randy Wolf (7–5) || None || 38,221 || 33–44
|-

|- style="background:#bfb"
| 78 || July 1 || Pirates || 4–3 || Paul Byrd (2–6) || Bronson Arroyo (0–2) || Jeff Brantley (11) || 48,406 || 34–44
|- style="background:#bfb"
| 79 || July 2 || Pirates || 9–1 || Curt Schilling (4–4) || Todd Ritchie (5–5) || None || 20,290 || 35–44
|- style="background:#bfb"
| 80 || July 3 || @ Brewers || 5–3 || Andy Ashby (3–7) || John Snyder (3–3) || Jeff Brantley (12) || 13,903 || 36–44
|- style="background:#bfb"
| 81 || July 4 || @ Brewers || 7–4 || Chris Brock (5–4) || Bob Wickman (2–2) || Jeff Brantley (13) || 14,602 || 37–44
|- style="background:#bfb"
| 82 || July 5 || @ Brewers || 5–2 || Randy Wolf (8–5) || Jamey Wright (4–2) || Wayne Gomes (7) || 10,677 || 38–44
|- style="background:#fbb"
| 83 || July 6 || @ Brewers || 2–4 || Jeff D'Amico (4–4) || Paul Byrd (2–7) || Bob Wickman (12) || 12,578 || 38–45
|- style="background:#fbb"
| 84 || July 7 || Orioles || 1–2 || Mike Mussina (6–7) || Curt Schilling (4–5) || Mike Timlin (8) || 21,882 || 38–46
|- style="background:#bfb"
| 85 || July 8 || Orioles || 13–4 || Andy Ashby (4–7) || José Mercedes (3–4) || None || 28,385 || 39–46
|- style="background:#fbb"
| 86 || July 9 || Orioles || 4–5 || Alan Mills (3–1) || Jeff Brantley (1–2) || Mike Timlin (9) || 28,100 || 39–47
|- style="background:#bbcaff;"
| – || July 11 ||colspan="7" |2000 Major League Baseball All-Star Game at Turner Field in Atlanta
|- style="background:#bfb"
| 87 || July 13 || @ Blue Jays || 8–5 || Curt Schilling (5–5) || Chris Carpenter (7–8) || Jeff Brantley (14) || 22,163 || 40–47
|- style="background:#fbb"
| 88 || July 14 || @ Blue Jays || 2–3 || Billy Koch (5–1) || Jeff Brantley (1–3) || None || 21,385 || 40–48
|- style="background:#bfb"
| 89 || July 15 || @ Blue Jays || 7–3 || Bruce Chen (5–0) || David Wells (15–3) || None || 24,828 || 41–48
|- style="background:#fbb"
| 90 || July 16 || @ Yankees || 8–9 (10) || Mariano Rivera (3–3) || Jeff Brantley (1–4) || None || 53,131 || 41–49
|- style="background:#bfb"
| 91 || July 17 || @ Yankees || 10–8 || David Coggin (2–0) || David Cone (1–8) || Chris Brock (1) || 38,987 || 42–49
|- style="background:#fbb"
| 92 || July 18 || @ Yankees || 1–3 || Denny Neagle (9–2) || Curt Schilling (5–6) || Mariano Rivera (22) || 40,013 || 42–50
|- style="background:#fbb"
| 93 || July 19 || @ Cubs || 4–5 || Félix Heredia (4–3) || Mark Holzemer (0–1) || None || 39,390 || 42–51
|- style="background:#bfb"
| 94 || July 20 || @ Cubs || 3–2 || Mark Brownson (1–0) || Kevin Tapani (6–8) || Jeff Brantley (15) || 38,848 || 43–51
|- style="background:#fbb"
| 95 || July 21 || @ Pirates || 2–9 || Jimmy Anderson (3–5) || Paul Byrd (2–8) || None || 22,438 || 43–52
|- style="background:#fbb"
| 96 || July 22 || @ Pirates || 1–2 || Bronson Arroyo (1–3) || Robert Person (5–3) || Mike Williams (14) || 28,485 || 43–53
|- style="background:#bfb"
| 97 || July 23 || @ Pirates || 4–1 || Curt Schilling (6–6) || Todd Ritchie (5–6) || None || 23,840 || 44–53
|- style="background:#fbb"
| 98 || July 25 || Cubs || 7–8 || Tim Worrell (3–3) || Chris Brock (5–5) || Rick Aguilera (22) || 22,065 || 44–54
|- style="background:#fbb"
| 99 || July 26 || Cubs || 9–14 || Félix Heredia (6–3) || Paul Byrd (2–9) || None || 17,825 || 44–55
|- style="background:#fbb"
| 100 || July 27 || Cubs || 1–4 || Steve Rain (2–0) || Vicente Padilla (2–2) || Rick Aguilera (23) || 30,722 || 44–56
|- style="background:#fbb"
| 101 || July 28 || Dodgers || 0–2 || Darren Dreifort (7–7) || Omar Daal (2–11) || Jeff Shaw (16) || 20,110 || 44–57
|- style="background:#bfb"
| 102 || July 29 || Dodgers || 3–0 || Cliff Politte (2–2) || Kevin Brown (10–4) || Jeff Brantley (16) || 35,189 || 45–57
|- style="background:#bfb"
| 103 || July 30 || Dodgers || 3–2 || Randy Wolf (9–5) || Chan Ho Park (11–8) || Jeff Brantley (17) || 23,301 || 46–57
|- style="background:#fbb"
| 104 || July 31 || @ Padres || 1–4 || Woody Williams (6–3) || Bruce Chen (5–1) || None || 43,207 || 46–58
|-

|- style="background:#fbb"
| 105 || August 1 || @ Padres || 9–10 (10) || Carlos Almanzar (2–3) || Jeff Brantley (1–5) || None || 18,274 || 46–59
|- style="background:#fbb"
| 106 || August 2 || @ Padres || 2–5 || Matt Clement (10–10) || Omar Daal (2–12) || Trevor Hoffman (26) || 14,447 || 46–60
|- style="background:#fbb"
| 107 || August 4 || @ Rockies || 1–8 || Julián Tavárez (7–2) || Kent Bottenfield (7–9) || None || 42,827 || 46–61
|- style="background:#fbb"
| 108 || August 5 || @ Rockies || 6–7 || José Jiménez (5–0) || Jeff Brantley (1–6) || None || 40,979 || 46–62
|- style="background:#bfb"
| 109 || August 6 || @ Rockies || 10–9 || Bruce Chen (6–1) || Pedro Astacio (9–8) || None || 38,278 || 47–62
|- style="background:#fbb"
| 110 || August 7 || Padres || 4–6 || Matt Clement (11–10) || Robert Person (5–4) || Trevor Hoffman (30) || 13,353 || 47–63
|- style="background:#bfb"
| 111 || August 8 || Padres || 10–4 || Omar Daal (3–12) || Brian Tollberg (2–2) || None || 14,181 || 48–63
|- style="background:#bfb"
| 112 || August 9 || Padres || 3–2 || Chris Brock (6–5) || Heathcliff Slocumb (2–4) || None || 16,541 || 49–63
|- style="background:#fbb"
| 113 || August 10 || Padres || 3–15 || Woody Williams (7–4) || Randy Wolf (9–6) || None || 15,681 || 49–64
|- style="background:#fbb"
| 114 || August 11 || Astros || 2–7 || Marc Valdes (3–4) || Vicente Padilla (2–3) || None || 15,551 || 49–65
|- style="background:#bfb"
| 115 || August 12 || Astros || 3–2 || Robert Person (6–4) || Wade Miller (1–4) || Jeff Brantley (18) || 21,188 || 50–65
|- style="background:#fbb"
| 116 || August 13 || Astros || 7–14 || José Cabrera (1–2) || Omar Daal (3–13) || None || 20,129 || 50–66
|- style="background:#fbb"
| 117 || August 14 || Diamondbacks || 3–4 (11) || Dan Plesac (2–0) || Jeff Brantley (1–7) || Matt Mantei (10) || 14,083 || 50–67
|- style="background:#fbb"
| 118 || August 15 || Diamondbacks || 6–11 || Byung-hyun Kim (3–5) || Wayne Gomes (4–5) || None || 16,949 || 50–68
|- style="background:#fbb"
| 119 || August 16 || Diamondbacks || 1–5 || Armando Reynoso (10–7) || Bruce Chen (6–2) || None || 23,498 || 50–69
|- style="background:#fbb"
| 120 || August 18 || @ Cardinals || 6–7 || Jason Christiansen (3–8) || Chris Brock (6–6) || None || 46,253 || 50–70
|- style="background:#fbb"
| 121 || August 19 || @ Cardinals || 3–6 || Pat Hentgen (12–9) || Omar Daal (3–14) || None || 47,163 || 50–71
|- style="background:#bfb"
| 122 || August 20 || @ Cardinals || 6–0 || Kent Bottenfield (8–9) || Britt Reames (0–1) || None || 43,000 || 51–71
|- style="background:#fbb"
| 123 || August 21 || @ Reds || 4–7 || Pete Harnisch (5–6) || Randy Wolf (9–7) || Danny Graves (21) || 21,558 || 51–72
|- style="background:#bfb"
| 124 || August 22 || @ Reds || 5–4 || Vicente Padilla (3–3) || Larry Luebbers (0–2) || Jeff Brantley (19) || 22,470 || 52–72
|- style="background:#bfb"
| 125 || August 23 || @ Reds || 4–3 || Chris Brock (7–6) || Danny Graves (10–4) || Vicente Padilla (1) || 20,255 || 53–72
|- style="background:#fbb"
| 126 || August 24 || @ Reds || 3–8 || Steve Parris (8–14) || Omar Daal (3–15) || None || 25,745 || 53–73
|- style="background:#fbb"
| 127 || August 25 || @ Giants || 3–16 || Russ Ortiz (10–10) || Kent Bottenfield (8–10) || None || 18,384 || 53–74
|- style="background:#bfb"
| 128 || August 26 || @ Giants || 5–2 || Randy Wolf (10–7) || Kirk Rueter (8–9) || Jeff Brantley (20) || 19,636 || 54–74
|- style="background:#bfb"
| 129 || August 27 || @ Giants || 2–1 (10) || Ed Vosberg (1–0) || Aaron Fultz (3–2) || None || 18,717 || 55–74
|- style="background:#bfb"
| 130 || August 28 || Rockies || 3–2 || Robert Person (7–4) || Masato Yoshii (5–14) || Jeff Brantley (21) || 14,118 || 56–74
|- style="background:#fbb"
| 131 || August 29 || Rockies || 1–2 || Brian Rose (5–7) || Omar Daal (3–16) || José Jiménez (17) || 14,862 || 56–75
|- style="background:#fbb"
| 132 || August 30 || Rockies || 4–5 (11) || Gabe White (9–1) || Wayne Gomes (4–6) || José Jiménez (18) || 14,150 || 56–76
|-

|- style="background:#fbb"
| 133 || September 1 || @ Dodgers || 1–2 || Mike Fetters (6–2) || Chris Brock (7–7) || Jeff Shaw (23) || 28,383 || 56–77
|- style="background:#fbb"
| 134 || September 2 || @ Dodgers || 0–1 (10) || Matt Herges (9–3) || Vicente Padilla (3–4) || None || 37,244 || 56–78
|- style="background:#fbb"
| 135 || September 3 || @ Dodgers || 1–6 || Chan Ho Park (15–8) || Robert Person (7–5) || Jeff Shaw (24) || 38,150 || 56–79
|- style="background:#fbb"
| 136 || September 4 || @ Giants || 0–3 || Russ Ortiz (12–10) || Omar Daal (3–17) || Robb Nen (34) || 40,930 || 56–80
|- style="background:#fbb"
| 137 || September 5 || @ Giants || 5–8 || John Johnstone (3–4) || Ed Vosberg (1–1) || Robb Nen (35) || 40,930 || 56–81
|- style="background:#fbb"
| 138 || September 6 || @ Giants || 4–5 || Aaron Fultz (4–2) || Vicente Padilla (3–5) || Alan Embree (2) || 40,930 || 56–82
|- style="background:#bfb"
| 139 || September 8 || @ Mets || 2–0 || Vicente Padilla (4–5) || Mike Hampton (13–9) || Jeff Brantley (22) || 38,808 || 57–82
|- style="background:#bfb"
| 140 || September 9 || @ Mets || 6–3 || Robert Person (8–5) || Turk Wendell (7–5) || None || 42,324 || 58–82
|- style="background:#fbb"
| 141 || September 10 || @ Mets || 0–3 || Al Leiter (15–7) || Omar Daal (3–18) || None || 53,775 || 58–83
|- style="background:#bfb"
| 142 || September 11 (1) || Expos || 5–2 || Cliff Politte (3–2) || Dustin Hermanson (11–13) || Jeff Brantley (23) || see 2nd game || 59–83
|- style="background:#fbb"
| 143 || September 11 (2) || Expos || 6–7 || Guillermo Mota (1–1) || Vicente Padilla (4–6) || Scott Strickland (5) || 11,310 || 59–84
|- style="background:#fbb"
| 144 || September 12 || Expos || 0–1 || Tony Armas Jr. (5–8) || Amaury Telemaco (1–1) || Scott Strickland (6) || 12,135 || 59–85
|- style="background:#bfb"
| 145 || September 13 || Expos || 15–5 || Bruce Chen (7–2) || Felipe Lira (4–6) || None || 12,316 || 60–85
|- style="background:#bfb"
| 146 || September 15 || Marlins || 7–4 || Robert Person (9–5) || A. J. Burnett (2–6) || None || 13,064 || 61–85
|- style="background:#fbb"
| 147 || September 16 || Marlins || 2–3 || Brad Penny (6–7) || Omar Daal (3–19) || Antonio Alfonseca (41) || 15,255 || 61–86
|- style="background:#bfb"
| 148 || September 17 || Marlins || 6–5 || Randy Wolf (11–7) || Chuck Smith (4–6) || Thomas Jacquez (1) || 15,486 || 62–86
|- style="background:#fbb"
| 149 || September 18 || Pirates || 5–6 || Rich Loiselle (1–3) || Vicente Padilla (4–7) || Mike Williams (20) || 11,470 || 62–87
|- style="background:#fbb"
| 150 || September 19 || Pirates || 8–12 || Matt Skrmetta (2–2) || Amaury Telemaco (1–2) || Mike Williams (21) || 11,362 || 62–88
|- style="background:#fbb"
| 151 || September 20 || Pirates || 6–7 (10) || Rich Loiselle (2–3) || Chris Brock (7–8) || Mike Williams (22) || 12,762 || 62–89
|- style="background:#bfb"
| 152 || September 21 || Mets || 6–5 || Jeff Brantley (2–7) || Rick White (5–9) || None || 17,769 || 63–89
|- style="background:#fbb"
| 153 || September 22 || Mets || 6–9 || Bobby J. Jones (10–6) || Randy Wolf (11–8) || Armando Benítez (39) || 21,128 || 63–90
|- style="background:#fbb"
| 154 || September 23 || Mets || 3–7 || Mike Hampton (14–10) || Cliff Politte (3–3) || None || 22,570 || 63–91
|- style="background:#fbb"
| 155 || September 24 || Mets || 2–3 || Glendon Rusch (11–11) || Bruce Chen (7–3) || Armando Benítez (40) || 31,391 || 63–92
|- style="background:#fbb"
| 156 || September 25 || @ Cubs || 3–4 || Rubén Quevedo (3–9) || Robert Person (9–6) || Tim Worrell (2) || 26,104 || 63–93
|- style="background:#bfb"
| 157 || September 26 || @ Cubs || 10–4 || Omar Daal (4–19) || Jon Lieber (12–11) || None || 26,055 || 64–93
|- style="background:#fbb"
| 158 || September 27 || @ Cubs || 0–1 || Kerry Wood (8–7) || Randy Wolf (11–9) || Tim Worrell (3) || 28,180 || 64–94
|- style="background:#bfb"
| 159 || September 28 || @ Cubs || 4–2 || Cliff Politte (4–3) || Joey Nation (0–2) || Vicente Padilla (2) || 22,916 || 65–94
|- style="background:#fbb"
| 160 || September 29 || @ Marlins || 1–7 || Chuck Smith (6–6) || Bruce Chen (7–4) || None || 15,816 || 65–95
|- style="background:#fbb"
| 161 || September 30 || @ Marlins || 5–11 || Reid Cornelius (4–10) || Robert Person (9–7) || None || 23,882 || 65–96
|-

|- style="background:#fbb"
| 162 || October 1 || @ Marlins || 5–7 || Ryan Dempster (14–10) || Amaury Telemaco' (1–3) || Antonio Alfonseca (45) || 21,055 || 65–97
|-

Roster

Player stats

Batting

Starters by positionNote: Pos = Position; G = Games played; AB = At bats; H = Hits; Avg. = Batting average; HR = Home runs; RBI = Runs batted inOther battersNote: G = Games played; AB = At bats; H = Hits; Avg. = Batting average; HR = Home runs; RBI = Runs batted inPitching

Starting pitchersNote: G = Games pitched; IP = Innings pitched; W = Wins; L = Losses; ERA = Earned run average; SO = StrikeoutsOther pitchersNote: G = Games pitched; IP = Innings pitched; W = Wins; L = Losses; ERA = Earned run average; SO = StrikeoutsRelief pitchersNote: G = Games pitched; W = Wins; L = Losses; SV = Saves; ERA = Earned run average; SO = Strikeouts Farm system 

Baseball America 2001 Directory

References

2000 Philadelphia Phillies season at Baseball Reference''

Philadelphia Phillies seasons
Philadelphia Phillies Season, 2000
Philadelphia Phillies